Landa Bazar is a 2002 Pakistani television drama serial aired on Prime Entertainment (STN). It is directed by Dilawar Malik and written by Khalil-ur-Rehman Qamar, premiered on 17 April 2002. The serial stars Tauqeer Nasir, Ali Zafar, Waseem Abbas, Kashif Mehmood, Babar Ali, Farah Shah, Mehmood Aslam, Jana Malik and Urooj. A sequel of the series, Laal Ishq was aired on A-Plus TV from 2017 to 2018.

Plot
The series is centered around a young man named Bali (Babar Ali) and his struggle to live and survive in a world of crime and corruption whilst also trying to build a relationship with his fiancée, Zohra (Farah Shah).

Cast 
 Babar Ali as Baali (Iqbal)
 Farah Shah as Zohra
 Ali Zafar as Ramis
 Khalil-ur-Rehman Qamar as Mehr Hukam
 Kashif Mehmood as Jajji Rungbaaz 
 Waseem Abbas as Mehr Charagh 
 Tauqeer Nasir as Yawar Kamal
 Urooj Nasir as Rabi
 Jana Malik as Maham
 Firdous Jamal as Hayat Ahmad
 Mehmood Aslam as Dawar Kamal
 Seemi Raheel as Surayya Batool
 Sohail Umer as Mehar Mubarak
 Rija Ali as Meeran
 Munir Nadir as MasterJee
 Nighat Butt as Hajran
 Faisal Rehman as Babu
 Shafqat Cheema

Music
"Jandi Wari Ohnon Akhoo" by Shafaqat Ali Khan

Sequel
On 26 July 2017, Dawn (newspaper) reported that Laal Ishq, the sequel, will also be written by Khalil-ur-Rehman Qamar and directed by Dilawar Malik. Qamar said, "I believe that the story-line has a coherent continuity and follows a rational trajectory, reflecting what's happening in society today. It has few characters from the original but there is whole new plot and hook to the play but this is surely very close to my heart." Most of the original cast will also reappear after 15 years of its original, except Farah Shah whose role was terminated in the original. Durab Khalil, son of Qamar, and new cast members such as Arsalan Idress, Anzeela Abbasi, Faryal Mehmood and Saba Hameed will make their debut in very important roles. Ali Zafar might also have a comeback on television, if he wants.

The sequel began airing from 14 October 2017 on A-Plus TV. Its official soundtrack has been sung by Rahat Fateh Ali Khan.

Lux Style Awards
'''''Best TV Play-Nominated

References

External links 

Pakistan Television Corporation original programming
Pakistani drama television series
Urdu-language television shows
2002 Pakistani television series debuts